Juan de Dios Hernández-Ruiz, S.J. (born November 14, 1948, in Holguín, Cuba) is a Cuban Roman Catholic bishop, currently serving as the Bishop of Pinar del Río since his appointment by Pope Francis on June 5, 2019. He previously served as the Titular Bishop of Passo Corese and Auxiliary Bishop of the Archdiocese of Havana.

He studied at the Seminary of Santiago de Cuba.  He was then transferred to the Seminario Mayor Interdiocesano de San Cristóbal de La Habana, where he studied philosophy and theology. He continued his studies in Rome at the Pontifical Gregorian University. In 1974 entered the Society of Jesus.  He was ordained a Jesuit priest on December 26, 1976. From 1980 to 1986 he was assigned as a priest to in Santiago de Cuba and Cienfuegos.  He again went to Rome for more studies and returned to Cuba assigned to the Archdiocese of Havana.

He was appointed Titular Bishop of Passo Corese and Auxiliary Bishop of the Archdiocese of Havana on December 3, 2005, and was consecrated a bishop on January 14, 2006, at the Cathedral of Havana by Jaime Lucas Ortega y Alamino, Cardinal Archbishop of Havana assisted by Mons. Emilio Aranguren-Echevarria, Bishop of Diocese of Holguín and Mons. Hector Luis Lucas Pena-Gomez Bishop Emeritus of Holguín.

References

External links

 Catholic Hierarchy bio
 Episcopologio de la Iglesia Católica en Cuba bio 

1948 births
Living people
People from Holguín
21st-century Roman Catholic bishops in Cuba
Cuban Jesuits
Jesuit bishops
Roman Catholic bishops of Havana
Bishops appointed by Pope Benedict XVI
20th-century Cuban Roman Catholic priests